Barrville is a census-designated place located in Brown Township, Mifflin County in the state of Pennsylvania, United States.  As of the 2010 census, the population was 160 residents.

Demographics

References

Census-designated places in Mifflin County, Pennsylvania
Census-designated places in Pennsylvania